The 111th Military Intelligence Brigade is a training brigade of the U.S. Army's Intelligence Center of Excellence under U.S. Army Training and Doctrine Command located at Fort Huachuca, Arizona.  The brigade has overall responsibility for four battalions who focus primarily on training Military Intelligence Corps soldiers.

Subordinate units:
  Headquarters & Headquarters Company
  304th Military Intelligence Battalion
  305th Military Intelligence Battalion
  309th Military Intelligence Battalion
  344th Military Intelligence Battalion

Lineage
 Constituted 10 May 1946 in the Army of the United States as the 111th Counter Intelligence Corps Detachment
 Activated 22 May 1946 at Atlanta, Georgia
 Allotted 6 October 1950 to the Regular Army
 Redesignated 1 December 1958 as the 111th Counter Intelligence Corps Group
 Redesignated 25 July 1961 as the 111th Intelligence Corps Group
 Redesignated 15 October 1966 as the 111th Military Intelligence Group
 Inactivated 9 January 1973 at Fort McPherson, Georgia
 Redesignated 13 March 1987 as Headquarters, 111th Military Intelligence Brigade; concurrently transferred to the United States Army Training and Doctrine Command and activated at Fort Huachuca, Arizona

References

Military intelligence brigades of the United States Army